Kymantas is a Lithuanian-language surname. Notable people with this surname include:

Kazimiera Kymantaitė (1909-1999), Lithuanian actress and stage director 
Simonas Kymantas (born 1993), Lithuanian basketball player 
Sofija Kymantaitė-Čiurlionienė (1886 - 1958), Lithuanian writer, activist, literary and art critic, playwright, poet, and translator

Lithuanian-language surnames